The 18th Empire Awards ceremony (officially known as the Jameson Empire Awards), presented by the British film magazine Empire, honored the best films of 2012 and took place on 24 March 2013 at the Grosvenor House Hotel in London, England. During the ceremony, Empire presented Empire Awards in 13 categories as well as four honorary awards. The honorary Outstanding Contribution to British Film Award was renamed Outstanding Contribution. The Art of 3D Award as well as the honorary Empire Legend Award and Outstanding Contribution Award were presented for the last time. The ceremony was televised in the United Kingdom by Sky Movies on March 30. Irish comedian Ed Byrne hosted the show for the first time. The awards were sponsored by Jameson Irish Whiskey for the fifth consecutive year.

In related events, Empire and Jameson Irish Whiskey held the 4th Done In 60 Seconds Competition Global Final on March 22, 2013 at the Google Campus, London, England. The team of judges consisted of Empire editor-in-chief Mark Dinning, Bauer Media CEO Paul Keenan, Sky Movies Premiere, English presenter Alex Zane, Scottish radio DJ Edith Bowman and English actors Joanne Froggatt and Tom Hiddleston, which selected from a shortlist of 23 nominees the five Done In 60 Seconds Award finalists that were invited to the Empire Awards where the winner was announced.

Skyfall won two awards including Best Film and Best Director for Sam Mendes. Other winners included The Hobbit: An Unexpected Journey also with two awards and Dredd, Headhunters, Les Misérables, Sightseers, Ted, The Hunger Games, The Impossible and The Woman in Black with one. Daniel Radcliffe received the Empire Hero Award, Sam Mendes received the Empire Inspiration Award, Helen Mirren received the Empire Legend Award and Danny Boyle received the Outstanding Contribution Award. Philip Askins from the United Kingdom won the Done In 60 Seconds Award for his 60-second film version of Blade Runner.

Winners and nominees
Winners are listed first and highlighted in boldface.

Multiple awards
The following two films received multiple awards:

Multiple nominations
The following 14 films received multiple nominations:

Done In 60 Seconds films

References

External links
 
 Live blog at Empire Online
 

Empire Award ceremonies
2012 film awards
2013 in London
2013 in British cinema
March 2013 events in the United Kingdom
2010s in the City of Westminster